Connie J. Cierpiot (born June 6, 1953) is an American politician.

Born in Kansas City, Missouri, Cierpiot graduated from Cardinal Glennon High School in 1971. Cierpiot was involved with church/ministry work, volunteer service. Cierpiot served in the Missouri House of Representatives 1994-2002 as a Republican. Cierpiot is married to Mike Cierpiot, who is also serving in the Missouri House of Representatives.

Notes

1953 births
Living people
Politicians from Kansas City, Missouri
Women state legislators in Missouri
Republican Party members of the Missouri House of Representatives
21st-century American women